Pierre Guédron (c. 1570 in Châteaudun – c. 1620 in Paris), was a French singer and composer known for writing Airs de cour (including Cessés mortels de soupirer).

Guédron's Est-ce Mars (1613) was especially popular and is known in versions by Sweelinck (keyboard), Scheidt (5 part strings) and Vallet (4 lutes of different sizes).

Works 
6 books of Airs de cour à quatre et cinq parties
Airs de différents autheurs mis en tablature de luth
1602: Ballet sur la Naissance de Monseigneur le duc de Vendosme 
1610: Ballet de Monseigneur le duc de Vendosme oder Ballet d’Alcine
1613: Ballet de Madame 
1614: Ballet des Argonautes
1615: Ballet du Triomphe de Minerve 
1615: Ballet de Monsieur le Prince 
1617: Ballet du Roy ou Ballet de la Délivrance de Renaud
1618: Ballet des Princes 
1619: Ballet du Roy sur L’Adventure de Tancrède en la forest enchantée

Editions available 
There is a large CNRS library edition of Air de cour.
Garland published a facsimile of the original print which is now out of print.

References 

French male classical composers
French Baroque composers
French ballet composers
Renaissance composers
People from Châteaudun
1570s births
1620s deaths
17th-century classical composers
17th-century male musicians